Muhyaddin Juma Masjid is a masjid (mosque) located at Nellikunnu, Kasaragod district. The mosque houses the tomb of Saint Thangal Uppapa, and is one of the pilgrimage centres in Kasaragod. It draws a huge number of devotees during the famous Nercha period held to mark the respect for the famous Saint Thangal Uppapa.

History
Even though the exact date of construction remains a mystery, Nellikunnu and Muslims of the locality owe their history to this great masjid. This masjid is devoted to the saint Muhyddin Abdul Qader Jeelani.

Authority
A committee is elected by the general body, is composed of noble and local and manages the daily routine of the masjid.

Thangal Uppapa Uroos
Thangal Uppapa Uroos is a ritual celebrated by the local people to remember the demise of the saint Thangal Uppapa. It takes place once every two years and usually in the month of Dul Hijj.

References

Mosques in Kerala
Religious buildings and structures in Kasaragod district